Gimme the Loot is a 2012 American comedy film written and directed by Adam Leon. The film competed in the Un Certain Regard section at the 2012 Cannes Film Festival. It won the Grand Jury Prize at the SXSW Film Festival in 2012. It was released on March 22, 2013, in the U.S.

Cast
 Ty Hickson as Malcolm
 Tashiana Washington as Sophia
 Zoë Lescaze as Ginnie
 Meeko as Champion
 Sam Soghor as Lenny
 Joshua Rivera as Rico

Release
After premiering at SXSW, Gimme the Loot was picked up for distribution by IFC Films/Sundance Selects in the U.S. It was officially “presented” in its release by Oscar-winning filmmaker Jonathan Demme.

The movie made its international premiere at the Cannes Film Festival and went on to play at numerous festivals around the world, including the London Film Festival, Deauville American Film Festival, and the Los Angeles Film Festival. It was released theatrically in France by Diaphana in January 2013, IFC Films/Sundance Selects in the U.S. on March 22, 2013, and by Soda Pictures in the U.K. in May 2013.

Reception

Critical response
The film received positive reviews. Review aggregation website Rotten Tomatoes gives a score of 92% based on 64 reviews.
Metacritic, another review aggregation website, assigned the film a score of 81 out of 100, based on 27 reviews from mainstream critics.

Roger Ebert called it, “A remarkably natural and unaffected film about friendship between two high-spirited graffiti artists” and Peter Travers of Rolling Stone in his 3.5 star review said the movie is, “A fresh, funky jolt of filmmaking joy.”

A.O. Scott of The New York Times wrote that, “Adam Leon’s loose and rambunctious debut… has a lot to say about the contradictions of a place that is defined by both abundant opportunity and ferocious inequality. But the film makes its points in a lighthearted, street-smart vernacular, treating its protagonists not as embodiments of a social condition but rather as self-aware individuals who are, like teenagers everywhere, both smart and dumb. Their friendship — which is based above all on shared artistic ambitions — is a perfect comic pairing.”

Other notable positive reviews included the Los Angeles Times, Christian Science Monitor, NPR, Entertainment Weekly, Chicago Tribune, The Wall Street Journal, and Chicago Sun-Times, whose Sheila O'Malley wrote, “Adam Leon has created something unique and current, with affectionate nods to New York films of the past.”

Box office
Released on March 22, 2013, in the United States, Gimme the Loot opened to the highest per screen average in the country.

Accolades
Along with the winning the Grand Jury Prize at the 2012 SXSW Film Festival,  Gimme the Loot was nominated for Best First Feature and won the Someone to Watch Award for director Adam Leon at the 2013 Independent Spirit Awards.

Adam Leon received a Gotham Award nomination for Bingham Ray Breakthrough Director in 2013.

The film also won Best Director at the Sofia Film Festival and Best Feature at the Molodist Film Festival, with lead actor Ty Hickson receiving a Special Jury Mention.

References

External links
 
 
 
 

2012 films
2012 comedy films
American comedy films
Films shot in New York City
American independent films
2012 independent films
Films scored by Nicholas Britell
2010s English-language films
2010s American films